Mount Gibbo is a mountain in the Australian Alps. It is 38 kilometres to the north-east of Benambra in Victoria, Australia and lies within the Mount Gibbo Natural Features and Scenic Reserve  managed by Parks Victoria. The reserve, which covers 1493.1 hectares, was established in 1979. On the northern side of the mountain, Ordovician sediments are exposed on the steep slopes. Surrounding peaks include Mount Pinnibar (1772 metres) to the north, Mount Hope (1558 metres) to the south-east and Mount Sassafras (1587 metres) to the west. Plant species found in the reserve include  the rare Alpine Phebalium (Phebalium squamulosum subsp. ozothamnoides) and the endangered Kosciuszko Grevillea  (Grevillea victoriae subsp. nivalis). The area was extensively burned by a bushfire in 2003.

See also

 Alpine National Park
 List of mountains in Victoria

References

Gibbo
Victorian Alps